Bombardier Itino is a diesel multiple unit manufactured by Bombardier Transportation, originally developed by Adtranz. It is in service in Germany and Sweden.

Railways

Germany
In Germany it has been designated as DB Class 613 and is operated on Odenwaldbahn and Erfurter Bahn. 27 units have been ordered by the two railways.

Sweden
In Sweden the unit has the designation Y31 and Y32, the latter for the three-car formation. Seventeen units have been delivered and are currently operated by Jönköpings Länstrafik, Kalmar Länstrafik, Norrtåg, Värmlandstrafik and Västtrafik. The Itino replaced the Y1 railcars.

Technology
The trains have two MAN diesel engines. The engines are based on truck engines, but larger (each /cylinder volume), also used for boats and electrical generators. They have hydraulic transmission. From 2008 new trains will have two engines from Iveco (also based on truck engines) and they will fulfill the latest environmental requirements for trucks. They will have mechanical automatic gearboxes from ZF Friedrichshafen meant for trucks.

The distinctive angled window pillar bodyshell construction was previously introduced by ABB/ADtranz on the Regioshuttle.

Brake problems
The multiple unit got a bad start in Sweden, when it was shown that the brakes could not cope with snow. This has led to the model being suspended during the winter for oversight, which mostly affected "Tåg i Bergslagen" (and "SJ AB" which at the time was taking them into service) with its traffic on Västerdalsbanan where the two first units were used. It has also from time to time affected other operators in Sweden. There has been a lot of other quality problems with these trains. The train traffic on Västerdalsbanan has been permanently replaced with buses from 2011.

Gallery

Bombardier Transportation multiple units
X31
Diesel multiple units of Germany